The Toronto International Film Festival Award for Best Canadian First Feature Film is an annual film award, presented by the Toronto International Film Festival to a film judged to be the best Canadian feature film made by a first-time director.

As of 2017, the award is sponsored by the City of Toronto government and thus known as the "City of Toronto Award for Best Canadian First Feature Film".

As with all of TIFF's juried awards, the jury has the discretion to grant one or more honorable mentions in addition to the main award winner.

The award has not been presented since 2019, although TIFF has not yet clarified whether it has been discontinued outright, or was merely suspended due to the COVID-19 pandemic in Canada and the reductions it imposed on the size of the festival programs in 2020 and 2021.

Winners
† denotes a film which also won the Best First Feature award at the Genie Awards or the Canadian Screen Awards.

See also
John Dunning Best First Feature Award
Prix Iris for Best First Film

References

Best Canadian First Feature Film
Directorial debut film awards
Awards established in 1997